The Index of Sustainable Economic Welfare (ISEW) is an economic indicator intended to replace the gross domestic product (GDP), which is the main macroeconomic indicator of System of National Accounts (SNA).
Rather than simply adding together all expenditures like the GDP, consumer spending is balanced by such factors as income distribution and cost associated with pollution and other unsustainable costs. The calculation excludes defence expenditures and considers a wider range of harmful effects of economic growth. It is similar to the genuine progress indicator (GPI).

The Index of Sustainable Economic Welfare (ISEW) is roughly defined by the following formula:

ISEW = personal consumption+ public non-defensive expenditures- private defensive expenditures+ capital formation+ services from domestic labour- costs of environmental degradation- depreciation of natural capital

History
GDP is misleading as an indicator or even as a proxy of the welfare of a nation, let alone as a measure of people's well-being, although the makers of economic policy commonly think to the contrary. This problem already became apparent in practical economic policies in most industrialised countries in the early 1970s. The most famous examples of this development are the MEW index developed by William Nordhaus and James Tobin in their Measure of Economic Welfare (MEW) in 1972, the Japanese Net National Welfare (NNW) indicator in 1973, the Economic Aspects of Welfare index (EAW) index of Zolatas in 1981, the ISEW indicator of Daly and Cobb in 1989 and the UN's human development index (HDI) in 1990. They are all based on neoclassical welfare economics and use as the starting point the System of National Accounts (SNA). The basic idea behind all these approaches is the inclusion of nonmarket commodities, positive and negative, to yield an aggregated macroindicator in monetary terms.

The EAW index, applied to the United States for the period from 1950 to 1977, showed that the economic aspects of social welfare are a diminishing function of economic growth in industrially mature, affluent societies. The percentage increases in social welfare over time are smaller than the corresponding increases in the GDP, and are diminishing. When the elasticity of the EAW/GDP ratio reaches zero, economic welfare will have attained its maximum value. Beyond that point any further increase in the GDP would lead to an absolute decline in economic welfare.

The ISEW was originally developed in 1989 by leading ecological economist and steady-state theorist Herman Daly and theologian John B. Cobb, but later they went on to add several other "costs" to the definition of ISEW. This later work resulted in yet another macroeconomic indicator Genuine Progress Indicator (GPI): see sustainability measurement. The GPI is an extension of ISEW that stresses genuine and real progress of the society and seeks especially to monitor welfare and the ecological sustainability of the economy. The ISEW and GPI summarise economic welfare by means of a single figure according to the same logic by which GDP summarises economic output into a single figure. Beside economic issues, social and environmental issues in monetary terms are included in the calculation.

Trend of ISEW in the United States

The calculation of the ISEW in the United States from 1950 to 1986 was done by Cobb and Daly in 1989. The results reveal that the increase in economic welfare of an average American has stabilised after the 1970s although the economy, measured by GDP, has continued to grow. According to Cobb and Daly's calculations the external effects of production and the inequity of income distribution are the main reasons for this development in which an increase in production does not necessarily lead to an increase in welfare.

Other countries and regions to calculate ISEW

Besides the USA there have been at least seven other countries or regions which have compiled the ISEW, namely the UK (Jackson & Marks 1994), Germany (Diefenbacher 1994), The Netherlands (Rosenberg & Oegema 1995), Austria (Stockhammer et al. 1995), British Columbia (Gustavson & Lonergan 1994), Sweden (Jackson & Stymne 1996), Chile (Castaneda 1999), Finland (Hoffrén 2001), Poland (Gil & Śleszyński 2003), Belgium (Bleys, 2008), Flanders (Bleys & Van der Slycken, 2019) and China (Zhu et al., 2021).

Progress of the Finnish ISEW 

The calculation of the ISEW for Finland has been done by Dr. Jukka Hoffrén at Statistics Finland in 2001 . Today the time period covered is extended to years from 1945 to 2010. According to the results, sustainable economic welfare rose steadily in the 1970s and early 1980s, but has since declined and stabilised. One of the underlying reasons for this development was effective income distribution which apportioned evenly the welfare derived from increased production. In the mid-1980s income disparities started to grow again, flows of capital (investments) abroad increased and environmental hazards escalated, resulting in a decline in the weighted personal consumption.

Major contributors to Finnish ISEW in 2000 (FIM billion, rp)
							
Weighted personal consumption	 + 467.8

Household work		    + 82.8
		
Other positive contributions	  + 21.7
		
Long-term environmental damage	 - 228.0
		
Environmental deterioration	 - 192,5

		
ISEW				 + 151,8

See also

Indices 

 Bhutan GNH Index
 Broad measures of economic progress
 Disability-adjusted life year
 Full cost accounting
 Green national product
 Green gross domestic product (Green GDP)
 Gender-related Development Index
 Genuine Progress Indicator (GPI)
 Global Peace Index
 Gross National Happiness
 Gross National Well-being (GNW)
 Happiness economics
 Happy Planet Index (HPI)
 Human Development Index (HDI)
 Legatum Prosperity Index
 Leisure satisfaction
 Living planet index
 Millennium Development Goals (MDGs)
 Money-rich, time-poor
 OECD Better Life Index BLI
 Subjective life satisfaction
 Where-to-be-born Index
 Wikiprogress
 World Happiness Report (WHR)
 World Values Survey (WVS)

Other 

 Economics
 Democracy Ranking
 Demographic economics
 Economic development
 Ethics of care
 Human Development and Capability Association
 Human Poverty Index
 Progress (history)
 Progressive utilization theory
 Post-materialism
 Psychometrics
 International Association for Feminist Economics
 International development
 Sustainable development
 System of National Accounts
 Welfare economics

References

 Bleys, B. (2008). Proposed changes in the Index of Sustainable Economic Welfare: An application to Belgium. Ecological Economics, 64, 741-751.
 Bleys, B., & Van der Slycken, J. (2019). De Index voor Duurzame Economische Welvaart (ISEW) voor Vlaanderen, 1990-2017. Studie uitgevoerd in opdracht van de Vlaamse Milieumaatschappij, MIRA, MIRA/2019/04, Universiteit Gent. Web: https://biblio.ugent.be/publication/8641018/file/8641020
 Daly, H. & Cobb, J. (1989), For the Common Good. Beacon Press, Boston.
 Delang, C.O. and Yu, Y.H. (2015) Measuring Welfare beyond Economics: The Genuine Progress of Hong Kong and Singapore. London: Routledge, 256 pages
 Diefenbacher, H. (1994), "The Index of Sustainable Economic Welfare in Germany", in C. Cobb & J. Cobb (eds.), The Green National Product, University of Americas Press
 Gil, S. & Śleszyński J. (2003), "An Index of Sustainable Economic Welfare for Poland", Sustainable Development, Vol. 11, No. 1, 2003, (47-55). 
 Hamilton C. (1999) "The Genuine Progress Indicator: methodological developments and results form Australia", Ecological Economics, vol. 30, pp. 13–28 
 Hoffrén J. (2001) "Measuring the Eco-efficiency of Welfare Generation in a National Economy. The Case of Finland." Statistics Finland. Research Reports 233. Helsinki. pp. 107–109.
 Jackson, T., Marks, N., Ralls, S., Strymne, S (1997) "An index of sustainable economic welfare for the UK 1950-1996", Centre for Environmental Strategy, University of Surrey, Guildford
 Jackson, T.  Marks, N. (2002) "Measuring Progress", New Economics Foundation and Friends of the Earth, London
 Jackson, T., McBride, N., Marks N., Abdallah, S. (2006-2007)"Measuring Regional Progress: Developing a Regional Index of Sustainable Economic Well-being for the English Regions", new economics foundation, London
 Nordhaus, W. and Tobin, J. (1972) Is growth obsolete?. Columbia University Press, New York
 Zhu, X., Liu, Y., & Fang, X. (2021). Revisiting the Sustainable Economic Welfare Growth in China: Provincial Assessment Based on the ISEW. Social Indicators Research, 1-28.
Ecological economics
Economics of sustainability
Sustainability metrics and indices